Vexillum humile is a species of small sea snail, marine gastropod mollusk in the family Costellariidae, the ribbed miters.

Description
The length of the shell varies between 7.5 mm and 9.8 mm.

Distribution
This marine species occurs off Madagascar, Mozambique, the Seychelles, the Maldives, the Philippines and Guam.

References

 Drivas, J. & Jay, M. (1988). Coquillages de La Réunion et de l'Île Maurice. Collection les beautés de la nature. Delachaux et Niestlé: Neuchâtel. ISBN 2-603-00654-1. pp. 1-160.

humile
Gastropods described in 1897